Calliclava albolaqueata is a species of sea snail, a marine gastropod mollusk in the family Drilliidae.

Description
The size of an adult shell varies between 20 mm and 24 mm. The shell has an ivory-white colour, and has ribs in slanting rows.

Distribution
This species occurs in the Pacific Ocean between Mexico and Nicaragua.

References

 Carpenter, P.P. (1865g) Diagnoses of new species of mollusks, from the west tropical region of North America, principally collected by Rev. J. Rowell, of San Francisco. Proceedings of the Zoological Society of London, 1865, 278–282
 Carpenter P. (1872)  Diagnoses of new species of mollusks, from the west tropical region of North America, principally collected by Rev. J. Rowell, of San Francisco. , Smithsonian Institution, Washington

External links
 

albolaqueata
Gastropods described in 1865